The 1986 GP Ouest-France was the 50th edition of the GP Ouest-France cycle race and was held on 26 August 1986. The race started and finished in Plouay. The race was won by Martial Gayant of the Système U team.

General classification

References

1986
August 1986 sports events in Europe
1986 in road cycling
1986 in French sport